Upperville is a small unincorporated town in Fauquier County, Virginia, United States, along U.S. Route 50 fifty miles from downtown Washington, D.C., near the Loudoun County line. Founded in the 1790s along Pantherskin Creek, it was originally named Carrstown by first settler Josephus Carr. Through an 1819 Act passed by the Virginia General Assembly, the name was changed to Upperville.

John Updike wrote of Upperville in his sardonic 1961 poem Upon Learning That a Town Exists Called Upperville.

History
Upperville has been designated as the Upperville Historic District and is a Virginia Historic Landmark that is listed in the National Register of Historic Places. Also listed are Blue Ridge Farm, Oakley, and Rose Hill Farm.

Situated eight miles to the west of Middleburg, the Upperville/Middleburg area is home to a number of prominent Thoroughbred horse breeding farms and country estates. Part of Virginia's famous Piedmont horse country, the Upperville Colt & Horse Show was conceived by Colonel Richard Henry Dulany and first held in 1853. It remains the oldest such event in America. A Dulany family member owned Oakley Farm. It was the site of two battles during the American Civil War. Near Upperville, Californian Henry T. Oxnard built a horse breeding operation in 1903 that he named Blue Ridge Farm. Purchased by Rear Admiral Cary Travers Grayson in 1928, members of the Grayson family still own the property which is listed in the National Register of Historic Places.

Over the years, others who came to live in the area included heiress Isabel Dodge Sloane, who built the highly successful Brookmeade Stud, Llangollen estate where Liz Whitney Tippett lived for nearly six decades, Bertram and Diana Firestone's Newstead Farm, Sandy Lerner's, and the very prestigious Rokeby Farm of Paul Mellon. It was Mellon who donated the money to build Trinity Episcopal Church in 1960 which is at the center of the small community's social activities. For two days each year more than ten horse farms and centers in Upperville and Middleburg open their gates to visitors. Since 1960, the Hunt Country Stable Tour has raised money for the outreach programs of Trinity Episcopal Church.

Notable people

 Sandy Lerner, co-founder of Cisco Systems, lives in Upperville, owning and operating a farm there.
Jill Holtzman Vogel, Virginia State Senator who with her husband owns a mansion in Upperville. 
Rachel "Bunny" (née Lambert) Mellon, horticulturist who designed the White House Rose Garden and established a botanical library at Oak Spring Farms.

Mary Elizabeth Whitney Person Lunn Tippett (born Mary Elizabeth Altemus) (June 18, 1906 – October 30, 1988) was a wealthy American socialite and philanthropist who was a champion horsewoman and for more than fifty years, a prominent owner/breeder of Thoroughbred racehorses. She owned Llangollen Estate which is on the National Register of Historic Places. She was married to John “Jock” Hay Whitney from 1930-1940. In 1930, Whitney purchased the Llangollen estate as a bridal gift for his fiancée, the Pennsylvania socialite Mary Elizabeth "Liz" Altemus. They entertained celebrities, politicians, and royalty at the estate.  

John Hay Whitney (August 17, 1904 – February 8, 1982) was U.S. Ambassador to the United Kingdom, publisher of the New York Herald Tribune, and president of the Museum of Modern Art. He was a member of the Whitney family. He was on the cover of Time magazine March 27,1933. In the 1970s, he was named one of the ten wealthiest men in the United States.

See also
 Battle of Upperville
 The Community Music School of the Piedmont

References

External links
 Upperville.com
 Story and Photos of Upperville by William T. Semple (PDF)

Unincorporated communities in Fauquier County, Virginia
Former municipalities in Virginia
Unincorporated communities in Virginia